The concept of irreconcilable differences provides possible grounds for divorce in a number of jurisdictions.

Australia
Australian family law uses a no-fault divorce approach, and irreconcilable differences is the sole grounds for divorce, with adequate proof being that the estranged couple have been separated for more than 12 months.

United States
In the United States, this is one of several possible grounds. Often, it is used as justification for a no-fault divorce. In many cases, irreconcilable differences were the original and only grounds for no-fault divorce, such as in California, which enacted America's first purely no-fault divorce law in 1969. California now lists one other possible basis, "permanent legal incapacity to make decisions" (formerly "incurable insanity"), on its divorce petition form.

Any sort of difference between the two parties that either cannot or will not be changed can be considered an irreconcilable difference. A difference could be that of  a difference in character, personality, belief, or some other personality trait. Some states use the terms irremediable breakdown, irretrievable breakdown, or incompatibility. In some states where the official grounds is 'irreconcilable differences', the statutory definition of that term may include a  waiting period or a  mutual-consent requirement.

References

Divorce
Family law